Eddie Gabriel Hernández Padilla (born 27 February 1991) is a Honduran footballer who plays as a forward for Motagua and the Honduras national team.

Club career
A tall striker, Hernández started his career at Platense F.C. and joined Swedish Allsvenskan side BK Häcken on loan for the 2012 season, but in June 2012 El Cañonero del Aguán  joined Motagua for the 2012 Apertura season.

On 9 March 2018, FC Irtysh Pavlodar announced the signing of Hernández. On 13 June 2018, Irtysh Pavlodar announced that Hernández had left the club by mutual consent.

International career
Hernández made his debut for Honduras in a May 2011 friendly match against El Salvador. He represented his country at the 2012 Summer Olympics and was a non-playing squad member at the 2011 CONCACAF Gold Cup.

International goals
Scores and results list Honduras' goal tally first.

References

External links

1991 births
Living people
People from Colón Department (Honduras)
Association football forwards
Honduran footballers
Honduras international footballers
Honduran expatriate footballers
Olympic footballers of Honduras
Footballers at the 2012 Summer Olympics
2011 CONCACAF Gold Cup players
2015 CONCACAF Gold Cup players
2017 Copa Centroamericana players
Platense F.C. players
F.C. Motagua players
BK Häcken players
Qingdao Hainiu F.C. (1990) players
Zob Ahan Esfahan F.C. players
Correcaminos UAT footballers
Deportes Tolima footballers
FC Irtysh Pavlodar players
C.D.S. Vida players
Al-Tai FC players
China League One players
Liga Nacional de Fútbol Profesional de Honduras players
Ascenso MX players
Categoría Primera A players
Kazakhstan Premier League players
Persian Gulf Pro League players
Saudi First Division League players
Expatriate footballers in Sweden
Honduran expatriate sportspeople in China
Expatriate footballers in China
Expatriate footballers in Colombia
Expatriate footballers in Iran
Expatriate footballers in Kazakhstan
Expatriate footballers in Saudi Arabia
Copa Centroamericana-winning players
C.D. Olimpia players